The 1991–92 season was Paris Saint-Germain's 22nd season in existence. PSG played their home league games at the Parc des Princes in Paris, registering an average attendance of 26,542 spectators per match. The club was presided by Michel Denisot and the team was coached by Artur Jorge. Bruno Germain was the team captain.

Summary

The takeover by French premium television channel Canal+ revitalised Paris Saint-Germain, whose 40% of its income came from televised games, allowing them to become one of the richest clubs in France. They wiped out PSG's huge 50 million francs debt and appointed Michel Denisot, journalist on the channel, as club president in place of Francis Borelli. This 1991–92 season was also synonymous with the end of the partnership with French radio RTL, the club's historic shirt sponsor since 1974, and the inception of the fan-dedicated Virage Auteuil stand.

PSG were experiencing their worst attendance record since returning to the top flight in 1974, with the violence and racism in the Kop of Boulogne taking the blame for this situation. To give non-violent and non-racist supporters in Boulogne an alternative, as well as boost the attendance levels, Canal+ backed the creation of Auteuil, which until then had been mainly composed of casual spectators and away fans. Encouraged and financed by the club, Lutèce Falco and Supras Auteuil were the first ultra groups of the new stand.

Now enjoying serious investment, PSG were able to set their sights steadily higher; they aimed to immediately qualify for Europe and become French champions within three years. Canal+ increased the club's budget from 90 to 120 million francs in order to build a strong squad. The revolution began with the appointment of renowned coach Artur Jorge, famous for leading Porto to the 1986–87 European Cup trophy, and the departure of eleven players including Jocelyn Angloma, Michel Bibard, Philippe Jeannol and PSG legend Safet Sušić.

The club then embarked on a spending spree, signing Brazilian internationals Ricardo and Valdo, proven French players Paul Le Guen, Laurent Fournier, Bernard Pardo, Bruno Germain and Patrick Colleter, and promising young star David Ginola. Despite criticism over Artur Jorge's solid but unpleasant playing style, PSG managed to achieve the goal set at the beginning of the campaign as they qualified for the UEFA Cup after finishing 3rd in the league. It was a fitting farewell for iconic goalkeeper Joël Bats, who retired at the end of the season.

Players 
As of the 1991–92 season.

Squad

Transfers 

As of the 1991–92 season.

Arrivals

Departures

Kits 

American electronics manufacturer Commodore and German dairy company Müller were the shirt sponsors. American sportswear brand Nike was the kit manufacturer.

Friendly tournaments

Coupe d'Été

Second round (Group Center)

Tournoi de Paris

Competitions

Overview

Division 1

League table

Results by round

Matches

Coupe de France

Statistics 

As of the 1991–92 season.

Appearances and goals 

|-
!colspan="16" style="background:#dcdcdc; text-align:center"|Goalkeepers

|-
!colspan="16" style="background:#dcdcdc; text-align:center"|Defenders

|-
!colspan="16" style="background:#dcdcdc; text-align:center"|Midfielders

|-
!colspan="16" style="background:#dcdcdc; text-align:center"|Forwards

|-

References

External links 

Official websites
 PSG.FR - Site officiel du Paris Saint-Germain
 Paris Saint-Germain - Ligue 1 
 Paris Saint-Germain - UEFA.com

Paris Saint-Germain F.C. seasons
Paris Saint-Germain